A cadaver is a dead human body.

Cadaver may also refer to:

 cadaver tomb, tomb featuring an effigy in the form of a decomposing body
 Cadaver (video game), a video game
 Cadaver (WebDAV client), a command-line WebDAV client for Unix
 Cadaver (band), a Norwegian death metal band
 Cadaver (Demonata), a demon in The Demonata
 Cadaver (2020 film), a Norwegian horror, also known as Kadaver
 Cadaver (2022 film), an Indian thriller
 Cadaver, a 2007 South Korean horror film also known as The Cut
 Cadaver, a 2018 film also known as The Possession of Hannah Grace in some countries
 slang for a "dead" B.E.A.M robot
 Cadaver Society, a secret society at Washington and Lee University

See also
Cadavres, a Canadian film
Carcass (disambiguation)
Carrion (disambiguation)
Corpse (disambiguation)
Dead body